A total lunar eclipse took place on Sunday 16 July 2000, the second of two total lunar eclipses in 2000.

The Moon passed through the very center of the Earth's shadow. Totality lasted for 106 minutes and 25 seconds, the longest duration since 13 August 1859 (106 minutes and 28 seconds) and 3 May 459 (106 minutes and 32 seconds), and totality of this length won't occur again until 19 August 4753 (106 minutes and 35 seconds). This was the last and longest total lunar eclipse of the 20th century as well as the second longest and last of the second millennium. It was also the eighth longest total lunar eclipse on EclipseWise's Six Millennium Catalog of Lunar Eclipses which covers the years 3000 BCE to 3000 AD. The longest total lunar eclipse between the years 4000 BCE and 6000 CE took place on 31 May 318. Totality lasted 106 minutes and 36 seconds which is only 11 seconds longer than this one.

Visibility 
It was seen completely over Australia, rising over Asia and Eastern Africa, and setting over Western North and South America.

Related eclipses

Eclipses of 2000 
 A total lunar eclipse on January 21.
 A partial solar eclipse on February 5.
 A partial solar eclipse on July 1.
 A total lunar eclipse on July 16.
 A partial solar eclipse on July 31.
 A partial solar eclipse on December 25.

Lunar year series

Saros series 

It last occurred on July 6, 1982 and will next occur on July 27, 2018.

This is the 37th member of Lunar Saros 129. The previous event was the July 1982 lunar eclipse. The next event is the July 2018 lunar eclipse. Lunar Saros 129 contains 11 total lunar eclipses between 1910 and 2090. Solar Saros 136 interleaves with this lunar saros with an event occurring every 9 years 5 days alternating between each saros series.

Tritos series

Inex series

Half-Saros cycle
A lunar eclipse will be preceded and followed by solar eclipses by 9 years and 5.5 days (a half saros). This lunar eclipse is related to two total solar eclipses of Solar Saros 136.

See also 
List of lunar eclipses
List of 20th-century lunar eclipses

Notes

External links 
 Total Lunar Eclipse of 2000 July 16
 
 Total Lunar Eclipse July 16, 2000
 Lunar Eclipse Facts: July 16, 2000
 
 Total Lunar Eclipse of 2000 July 16 A Report with Photographs  ©2000 by Fred Espenak]
 Total lunar eclipse 16 July 2000, as seen from Wellington New Zealand
 

2000–07
2000–07
2000 in science
July 2000 events